Albania has an embassy in Bucharest and Romania an embassy in Tirana and a consulate in Korçë. On 16 December 2013, a celebration was held in Romania celebrating the hundredth anniversary of the establishment of diplomatic relations between the two nations.

The countries are both members of the North Atlantic Treaty Organization,  La Francophonie and the Organization for Security and Co-operation in Europe. As a European Union (EU) member, Romania supports Albania in its euro-integration path.

History

Modern 

The Rilindja Kombëtare movement of Albanian nationalism inside the Ottoman Empire was present and prolific in Wallachia, the center of cultural initiatives taken by Dora d'Istria, Naim Frashëri, Jani Vreto, and Naum Veqilharxhi (the latter published the first ever Albanian primer in Bucharest, in 1844). Aleksandër Stavre Drenova, a resident of Bucharest, authored the lyrics of Albania's national anthem, Hymni i Flamurit, which is sung to the tune of "Pe-al nostru steag e scris Unire", composed by the Romanian Ciprian Porumbescu.

Among the new groups of immigrants from various Balkan regions to Romania were the families of poets Victor Eftimiu and Lasgush Poradeci. At the time, the independence movement gathered momentum, and, for a while after 1905, was focused on the activities of Albert Gjika. An Albanian school was opened in 1905 in the city of Constanța — among its pupils was poet Aleksandër Stavre Drenova. In 1912, at a Bucharest meeting headed by Ismail Qemali and attended by Drenova, the first resolution regarding Albania's independence was adopted. In 1921, the first translation of the Qur'an into Albanian was completed by Ilo Mitkë Qafëzezi and published in the city of Ploieşti.

In the late Ottoman period, some Albanian intellectuals developed a historico-political theory that the Albanians and the Vlachs, including modern Romanians, were "blood-brothers", and should fight for mutual liberation in the still Ottoman-administered territories with assistance from Romania or Italy. This view came to be supported by Austro-Hungary after 1897. Visar Dodani ran a newspaper in Bucharest from 1897 onward, and beginning in March 1898, it advocated a view of the common Illyrian origin of Albanians and Romanians, and their shared contemporary struggle.

Romania was the first country to recognize Albania's independence. Relations between Albania and Romania were established on December 16, 1913. Since then, the two countries developed strong cultural and linguistic ties. The Albanian writer and poet Lasgush Poradeci lived and studied in Romania for some time, along with other influential Albanian figures. A treaty of friendship was signed between the two countries in 1994.

Relations 

On March 18, 2014, Edi Rama, the prime minister of Albania, met with Victor Ponta, the prime Minister of Romania, during the latter's first official visit to Tirana. The two discussed expanding ties between the two countries economically, in terms education (with a number of Albanian students studying in Romania and Albanian Police officers being trained by Romanians), as well as sharing Romania's experience in ascending to the European Union with Albania. They also discussed Romanian businesses opening offices in Tirana to increase economic cooperation, and training of Albanian police officers by Romania to combat organized crime. In February 2015, Ponta offered to make an energy deal with Romania. He also stated that expansion of cooperation in other fields will continue as well.

Economic relations
Both countries entered into a free trade agreement which came into force on 1 January 2017.

The value of bilateral trade on 2016 was 83 million euros.

Diplomacy

Republic of Albania
Bucharest (Embassy) 

Republic of Romania
Tirana (Embassy)

See also
Foreign relations of Albania
Foreign relations of Romania 
Accession of Albania to the European Union
Romania's reaction to the 2008 Kosovo declaration of independence
Albanian–Romanian linguistic relationship

References

 
Romania
Albania